Jay Guy Cisco (April 25, 1844 - April 24, 1922) was an American Confederate veteran, journalist, diplomat and businessman. He was the owner of a bookstore and the editor of the Forked Deer Blade newspaper in Jackson, Tennessee. He was a U.S. consul to Mexico, and an agent for the Louisville and Nashville Railroad.

Early life
Cisco was born on April 25, 1844 in New Orleans, Louisiana. During the American Civil War of 1861-1865, he served in the Confederate States Army. He subsequently traveled to Europe.

Career
Cisco moved to Jackson, Tennessee, where he was the owner of a bookstore known as Cisco's Bookstore. He became the editor of the Forked Deer Blade in Jackson in 1883. He was a proponent of prohibition.

Cisco was appointed as a consul to Mexico by President Grover Cleveland in 1888. He was an agent for the Louisville and Nashville Railroad from 1897 to 1922.

Personal life and death
Cisco married Mildred George Pursley; they had four sons and two daughters. They resided at 912 Boscobel Street in Nashville.

Cisco died on April 24, 1922 in Nashville.

Works

References

1844 births
1922 deaths
Writers from New Orleans
People from Jackson, Tennessee
People from Nashville, Tennessee
Editors of Tennessee newspapers
19th-century American newspaper editors
20th-century American newspaper editors
Businesspeople from Tennessee
Louisville and Nashville Railroad people
Military personnel from Louisiana